Charan Narzary (28 May 1933 – 23 July 2019) was an Indian politician. He was elected to the Lok Sabha, lower house of the Parliament of India from the Kokrajhar in Assam in 1977 as an independent. He founded Plain Tribals Council of Assam in 1966 a militant agitation for a separate tribal and indigenous Scheduled Caste communities state called Udayachal under the leadership of Samar Brahma Chowdhury and Narzary, President and General Secretary of PTCA respectively. He was a poet and writer and was teacher at Kokrajhar College.

References

External links
Biographical Sketch Member of Parliament 

India MPs 1977–1979
Lok Sabha members from Assam
1933 births
2019 deaths
Independent politicians in India
People from Kokrajhar
Assam MLAs 1985–1991
Bodo people